Clayton Palmer (14 July 1885 – 11 April 1956) was an English first-class cricketer active 1904–12 who played for Middlesex. He was born in Westminster; died in East Grinstead.

References

1885 births
1956 deaths
English cricketers
Middlesex cricketers
Marylebone Cricket Club cricketers
Cambridge University cricketers
Gentlemen of England cricketers
H. D. G. Leveson Gower's XI cricketers